Terry Radigan is an American country music singer. She has recorded one unreleased album for Asylum Records, and one album for Vanguard Records.

Biography
Radigan was born in Brooklyn, New York. At age four, she was raised by her grandparents after her mother was diagnosed with cancer. In high school, Radigan formed her own band and performed in local clubs. Before beginning her country career, Radigan was guitarist in the band Grace Pool.

She released her debut single "Half a Million Teardrops" via Asylum Records in March 1995. The single was reviewed favorably by Billboard, which praised the "dreamy-but-gritty vocal" and compared Radigan favorably to Emmylou Harris, whose former producer, Brian Ahern, produced the track. Wally Wilson and Mike Henderson wrote the song, which was originally recorded by Holly Dunn on her 1992 album Getting It Dunn. The single was to have been included on an album titled Pawnbroker's Daughter, which was never released. It would have included seven songs that Radigan wrote, plus covers of Eric Carmen's "Never Gonna Fall in Love Again" and Bruce Springsteen's "Two Faces".

After leaving Asylum, Radigan wrote album tracks for Trisha Yearwood, Patty Loveless, and Trick Pony. On May 16, 2000, she released the album Radigan through Vanguard Records. She co-produced the album with Justin Niebank and guitarist Kenny Greenberg. People magazine reviewed Radigan favorably, praising Radigan's lyrics and her rendition of "When It Comes to You".

Discography

Albums

Singles

Music videos

References

American women country singers
American country singer-songwriters
Asylum Records artists
Country musicians from New York (state)
Living people
People from Brooklyn
Vanguard Records artists
Singer-songwriters from New York (state)
20th-century American singers
20th-century American women singers
21st-century American singers
21st-century American women singers
Year of birth missing (living people)